Abacetus pseudomashunus is a species of ground beetle in the subfamily Pterostichinae. It was described by Straneo in 1950.

References

pseudomashunus
Beetles described in 1950